Robinetinidin is an anthocyanidin, a type of flavonoid.

Prorobinetinidins, condensed tannins oligomers containing robinetinidol, can be found in Stryphnodendron adstringens. They yield robinetinidin when depolymerized under oxidative conditions.

References

See also 
 Robinetinidol, the corresponding flavan-3ol
 Leucorobinetinidin, the corresponding leucoanthocyanidin

Anthocyanidins
Pyrogallols